The Tour de Guadeloupe is an annual men's multiple stage road bicycle race held each August in the French Caribbean island of Guadeloupe.

Founded in 1948 under the name Tour Cycliste de la Guadeloupe, this elite men's competition opened officially to overseas racers in 1979, changing its name to Tour Cycliste international de la Guadeloupe. Covering a majority of the island's territory, the race includes today a prologue time trial and eight to nine stages.

For 2005 to 2012, 2014, and in 2021, the race was part of the UCI America Tour, which is one of six UCI Continental Circuits ruled by the Union Cycliste Internationale, the international governing body for cycling. Since then, the race has been rated as a 2.2 event on the Union Cycliste Internationale (UCI) classification standards. In 2013, from 2015 to 2020 and since 2022, the race has been on the UCI Europe Tour calendar.

This event is organized by the Comité régional de cyclisme de la Guadeloupe (en: Regional cycling committee of Guadeloupe).

History of Results

Top Three Winners as of 2.2 UCI race classification (since 2005)

Amateur winners (1948-2004)

Notes

References

External links 
Official website of the Regional Cycling Committee of Guadeloupe
International Cycling Tour of Guadeloupe on info97.com
 

 
Cycle racing in Guadeloupe
UCI America Tour races
Cycle races in France
Recurring sporting events established in 1948
1948 establishments in France
UCI Europe Tour races